Atlantic Realm is the eleventh album by Irish folk group Clannad, released in 1989. It is the soundtrack to the BBC television series The Natural World: Atlantic Realm, a documentary about the Atlantic Ocean.

Track listing
 "Atlantic Realm" – 3:49
 "Predator" – 3:05
 "Moving Thru" – 3:10
 "The Berbers" – 1:17
 "Signs of Life" – 2:04
 "In Flight" – 3:07
 "Ocean of Light" – 3:30
 "Drifting" – 1:53
 "Under Neptune's Cape" – 3:19
 "Voyager" – 3:19
 "Primeval Sun" – 1:09
 "Child of the Sea" – 2:40
 "The Kirk Pride" – 1:19

Charts

1989 albums
Clannad albums